Niederstetten is a town and a municipality in the Main-Tauber district, in Baden-Württemberg, Germany. It is situated 14 km southeast of Bad Mergentheim, and 19 km west of Rothenburg ob der Tauber.

Sights

The main attraction is the Castle Haltenbergstetten.

Museum
The Albert-Sammt-Zeppelin-Museum is in memory of last German airship captain Albert Sammt and shows original parts as well as documents of Zeppelin history.

Economy, industry and infrastructure

Military 
Niederstetten is home to German Army Aviation Transport Helicopter Regiment 30 based at Niederstetten Air Base.

International relations

Niederstetten is twinned with:
  Le Plessis-Bouchard (France).

References

Main-Tauber-Kreis
Württemberg
Historic Jewish communities